The 2012 Missouri lieutenant gubernatorial election was held on November 6, 2012. Incumbent Republican Peter Kinder faced Democratic nominee and former state auditor Susan Montee, Libertarian Matthew Copple, and the Constitution Party nominee, former state representative Cynthia Davis.

Background
Incumbent lieutenant governor Peter Kinder won the 2008 Missouri lieutenant gubernatorial election with 49.9% of the vote against Democratic candidate Sam Page. Kinder had been considered the front-runner in the 2012 Republican Gubernatorial primary, however after various controversies emerged, he decided to run for re-election. His decision was also influenced by St. Louis businessman and multimillionaire Dave Spence unexpectedly declaring to run for governor and pledging to put much of his own money into the race.

Timeline
March 27, 2012 – Filing deadline for Democrats, Republicans and Libertarians
August 7, 2012 – Primary (gubernatorial and other statewide office) elections
August 21, 2012 – Filing deadline for other third parties and Independents
November 6, 2012 – General election.

Republican primary

Candidates

Declared
 Michael E. Carter, former Municipal Judge, Corporate Attorney and Democratic candidate for lieutenant governor in 2008
 Peter Kinder, incumbent lieutenant governor
 Brad Lager, state senator
 Charles W. Kullmann, retired college teacher

Declined
 Ed Martin, attorney
 Chris McKee, developer
 Luann Ridgeway, state senator
 Steven Tilley, Speaker of the Missouri House of Representatives

Polling

Results

Democratic primary

Candidates

Declared
 Judy Baker, former state representative and former regional director of the United States Department of Health and Human Services
 Sara Lampe, state representative
 Susan Montee, former State Auditor of Missouri and former Chairwoman of the Missouri Democratic Party
 Becky Plattner, Missouri Conservation Commission chairwoman, former Presiding Commissioner of Saline County and candidate for lieutenant governor in 2008

Declined
 Mike Sanders, County Executive of Jackson County
 Wes Shoemyer, former state senator

Polling

Results

Libertarian primary

Candidate
 Matthew Copple

Results

Constitution primary

Candidate
 Cynthia Davis, former state representative

Results

General election
Kinder defeated all other candidates to become the first Missouri Lieutenant Governor to be elected to a third term since Frank Gaines Harris, who served from January 1933 to December 1944. Kinder received 49.4 percent of the vote while Susan Montee received 45.4 percent. Libertarian Matthew Copple and Constitution Party candidate Cynthia L. Davis garnered 2.8 and 2.4 percent, respectively.

Polling

Results

See also
 2012 United States gubernatorial elections
 2012 United States Senate election in Missouri
 2012 United States House of Representatives elections in Missouri
 2012 Missouri gubernatorial election
 2012 Missouri Attorney General election
 2012 Missouri State Treasurer election
 2012 Missouri Secretary of State election

References

External links
Elections from the Missouri Secretary of State
Missouri Governor candidates at Project Vote Smart

Official campaign websites
Judy Baker for Lieutenant Governor
Mike Carter for Lieutenant Governor
Cynthia Davis for Lieutenant Governor
Peter Kinder for Lieutenant Governor
Brad Lager for Lieutenant Governor
Sara Lampe for Lieutenant Governor
Susan Montee for Lieutenant Governor
Becky Plattner for Lieutenant Governor

lieutenant gubernatorial
Missouri
2012